The Process is an American reggae band from Detroit, Michigan, United States, and was formed by David Asher and Garrick Owen in 1989.  Their music is a blend of high energy rock and reggae. The band and  its members have worked with Adrian Sherwood, dub producer The Scientist, Skip "Little Axe" McDonald, Congo Natty aka Rebel MC, George Clinton, Bernie Worrell, guitarist Dick Wagner, midwest rappers The Dayton Family, Ghetto Priest and other members of Asian Dub Foundation, and H.R. the lead singer of the hardcore punk rock pioneers Bad Brains.

Members
 David Asher - Vocals
 Garrick Owen - Guitar
 Seth Payton - Bass, Guitar, Keyboards, Programming
 Bill Heffelfinger - Bassist and programmer
 Gabe Gonzalez - Drums

Discography

Studio albums
 Mystery Babylon (1991)
 Baldhead Vex (1992)
 Dub Instructor (1994)
 Craven Dog (1996)
 Blood & Bones (2002)
 Weapons of Mass Percussion (2006)
 Who Is That Mad Band? (2016)
 Dub World (2017)

Singles and EPs
 "Lion of Judah Hath Prevailed" (2011)
 "Gypsy Wind" (2013)
 "Fire is Burning" (2016)

Live albums
 Live In Los Angeles (Official Live Bootleg) (2001)

Band compilations
 Paraphernaila Vol. 1 (2001)

Compilation albums
 Pop O.D.: The Songs of Iggy Pop (Various Artists) (1998)
 Detroit Musicians Alliance: Motor CD (Various Artists) (1999)
 Detroit Music Awards - 2003 (Various Artists) (2003)
 Reggae Against Landmines, Vol. 3 (Various Artists) (2012)
 Music for the People of Gaza - Volume 2 by Artists Against Apartheid (Various Artists) (2014)
 Guitar Wizards vol 3/4 featuring The Process Jah made the Herb and various artists (2016)

Music videos
 Legacy: Live DVD (2003)
 Live at the Vassar Theater DVD (2008)
 Pigman the Movie - Short film featuring The Process song - Pigman.

References

External links

The Process official Facebook Page

 Music Video: Get Up Stand Up! The Process Live at Prime Event Center
 Music Video: "Blood Runnings" The Process Live at Prime Event Center
 Interview: David Asher Interview (2014)

Reggae rock groups
Reggae metal musical groups
Musical groups from Michigan
Musicians from Michigan
Musicians from Detroit
Musical groups established in 1989
Musical quartets
1989 establishments in Michigan